The Wichita Jr. Thunder were an Amateur Athletic Union-sanctioned junior ice hockey team based in Wichita, Kansas, and played home games at the Wichita Ice Center. The team was a member of the Western States Hockey League (WSHL). The league and team were dormant for the 2020–21 season due to the COVID-19 pandemic, but the Jr. Thunder were not included as a member of the league when it restarted in 2021.

In addition to games played during the regular season, the Jr. Thunder played an exhibition game against the Wichita Thunder alumni at the Intrust Bank Arena. Former Thunder player Rob Weingartner was the team's head coach from 2012 to 2019.

Season-by-season records

References

External links
 Wichita Jr. Thunder Official website
 Western States Hockey League Website

Ice hockey teams in Kansas
Sports in Wichita, Kansas
2012 establishments in Kansas
Ice hockey clubs established in 2012